The Half-Baked Serenade is the second studio album by alternative pop/rock band Self.

Initially designed only as an EP (eventually expanded into a whole album) and released only though a mail-order catalog, it's become very rare and is considered the "Holy Grail" among Self releases. Due to its rarity, the album is less popular amongst Self fans than Subliminal Plastic Motives, but critical reception remained positive.

Mahaffey recorded the album at his house in Murfreesboro as a treat for fans clamoring for a new Self release.  The song "KidDies" became a minor hit (receiving heavy rotation at KROQ-FM in Los Angeles), in part due to its amusing lyrics which poke fun at Marilyn Manson. With its Halloween theme, it still receives some scattered radio play nationally, particularly during October. The songs "Dielya Downtown" and "Microchip Girl" also became favorites of Self fans with the former becoming a live staple of the band.

The album was a departure from the Subliminal Plastic Motives in that most of the songs showcase a more electronic, funky character and do not feature guitars, yet it was still firmly rooted in Mahaffey's unique pop-rock style. The Half-Baked Serenade reaffirmed Mahaffey's talents as a prodigal, do-it-yourself composer, performer, and engineer.

Track listing

Personnel
Written, Produced and Performed* at home by Matt Mahaffey

Engineered by Matt Mahaffey

Mixed by Chris James, Jason Rawlings and Matt Mahaffey at Chris's house

Mastered by Tommy Dorsey at Masterfonics

Art Direction and Design by Brian Bottcher

*except:
Jason Rawlings - drums on track 2
Mike Mahaffey - guitar on track 9
Brian Rogers - guitar on track 4

External links
http://www.self-centered.org/ - Self lyrics and other information

1997 albums
Self (band) albums